WKAZ-FM (107.3 MHz, "107.3 KAZ") is a radio station licensed to Miami, West Virginia. Owned by West Virginia Radio Corporation, it broadcasts a country music format serving the Charleston area.

History
When the station was initially launched, it was known as “Country Heaven 107“, broadcasting from Miami (Cabin Creek) West Virginia.  Its call letters were WVCM, which stood for “West Virginia’s Country Music“.

In 1987, after it and WXIT-AM were acquired by Empire Broadcasting, the format was changed to a “light pop“ format, and the station was known as “Lite 107“.  The call letters were subsequently changed to WLZT to signify the “lite“ element of the station.

In early 1989, the station would switch to an oldies format, keeping the WLZT call sign, and the tag became “Z–107“.  

Bristol Broadcasting Company acquired the station circa 1992, and briefly changed the format to the CD Country satellite feed format.  They retagged the station as “QBE2“, designating it as a high sound quality, continuous music companion to Bristol’s main country station in the market, WQBE.

After approximately a year, the station reverted back to oldies and adopted the dormant WKAZ callsign. Original WKAZAM – 95 personality Frank George hosted an all request hour at noon on weekdays.

The West Virginia Radio Corporation purchased WKAZ-FM and WSWW-AM in 1995.  It initially had an all-70s format until Spring 1997. 

Around that time, sister station 580 WCHS would move its oldies format to WKAZ-FM in favor of a news and talk radio format. 

In 2006, WKAZ flipped from Oldies to Adult Hits under the "Jack FM" branding, using the ABC Radio satellite feed. 

In March 2007, after the Jack FM format was not well received by listeners in the area, WKAZ-FM restored the previous oldies format using Tom Kent's "Classic Top 40" branding. It positioned itself as "107.3 WKAZ-FM, Classic Top 40".

On April 25, 2012, WKAZ-FM changed its format to classic rock, branded as "107.3 K-Rock".

On August 8, 2014, after stunting for a day with patriotic-themed songs, WKAZ-FM flipped to an eclectic format as Tailgate 107.3. Positioned as a "no rules" format featuring "Party Songs for Party People", the station played a broad mix of current pop and country music, as well as classic hits spanning as far back as the 1970's.

On April 1, 2020, the station flipped to country music as 107.3 KAZ, flanking sister station classic country WKWS.

References

External links
107-3 KAZ Online
History of WKNA/WKAZ/WQBE

KAZ-FM
HD Radio stations
Radio stations established in 1983
KAZ-FM